The black-spotted bare-eye (Phlegopsis nigromaculata) is a species of insectivore passerine bird in the antbird family Thamnophilidae. It is found in Bolivia, Brazil, Colombia, Ecuador, and Peru. Its natural habitats are subtropical or tropical moist lowland forests.

The black-spotted bare-eye was described by the French naturalists Alcide d'Orbigny and Frédéric de Lafresnaye in 1837 and given the binomial name Myothera nigro-maculata. The specific epithet combines the Latin words niger for "black" and maculatus  for "spotted".

There are four subspecies:
 Phlegopsis nigromaculata nigromaculata (d'Orbigny & Lafresnaye, 1837) – southeast Colombia, east Ecuador, east Peru, north Bolivia and southwest Amazonian Brazil
 Phlegopsis nigromaculata bowmani Ridgway, 1888 – south central Amazonian Brazil and central Bolivia
 Phlegopsis nigromaculata confinis Zimmer, JT, 1932 – east central Amazonian Brazil
 Phlegopsis nigromaculata paraensis Hellmayr, 1904 – northeast Brazil south of the Amazon

The sexes are alike.

This species is a specialist ant-follower that relies upon swarms of army ants to flush insects and other arthropods out of the leaf litter.

References

Further reading

black-spotted bare-eye
Birds of the Amazon Basin
black-spotted bare-eye
Birds of Brazil
Taxonomy articles created by Polbot